Vijaya College may refer to:

Vijaya College, Bangalore in Bangalore, Karnataka, India
Vijaya College, Matale in Matale, Sri Lanka
Vijaya College, Mulki in Mulki, Karnataka, India